A web application (or web app) is application software that is accessed using a web browser. Web applications are delivered on the World Wide Web to users with an active network connection.

History
In earlier computing models like client-server, the processing load for the application was shared between code on the server and code installed on each client locally.  In other words, an application had its own pre-compiled client program which served as its user interface and had to be separately installed on each user's personal computer. An upgrade to the server-side code of the application would typically also require an upgrade to the client-side code installed on each user workstation, adding to the support cost and decreasing productivity.  In addition, both the client and server components of the application were usually tightly bound to a particular computer architecture and operating system and porting them to others was often prohibitively expensive for all but the largest applications (Nowadays, native apps for mobile devices are also hobbled by some or all of the foregoing issues).

In 1995, Netscape introduced a client-side scripting language called JavaScript allowing programmers to add some dynamic elements to the user interface that ran on the client side. So instead of sending data to the server in order to generate an entire web page, the embedded scripts of the downloaded page can perform various tasks such as input validation or showing/hiding parts of the page.

In 1999, the "web application" concept was introduced in the Java language in the Servlet Specification version 2.2. [2.1?]. At that time both JavaScript and XML had already been developed, but Ajax had still not yet been coined and the XMLHttpRequest object had only been recently introduced on Internet Explorer 5 as an ActiveX object.

In 2005, the term Ajax was coined, and applications like Gmail started to make their client sides more and more interactive. A web page script is able to contact the server for storing/retrieving data without downloading an entire web page.

Structure

Traditional PC applications consist only of 1 tier, which resides on the client machine, but web applications lend themselves to a multi-tiered approach by nature. Though many variations are possible, the most common structure is the three-tiered application. In its most common form, the three tiers are called presentation, application and storage. A web browser is the first tier (presentation), an engine using some dynamic Web content technology (such as ASP, CGI, ColdFusion, Dart, JSP/Java, Node.js, PHP, Python or Ruby on Rails) is the middle tier (application logic), and a database is the third tier (storage). The web browser sends requests to the middle tier, which services them by making queries and updates against the database and generates a user interface.

For more complex applications, a 3-tier solution may fall short, and it may be beneficial to use an n-tiered approach, where the greatest benefit is breaking the business logic, which resides on the application tier, into a more fine-grained model. Another benefit may be adding an integration tier that separates the data tier from the rest of tiers by providing an easy-to-use interface to access the data. For example, the client data would be accessed by calling a "list_clients()" function instead of making an SQL query directly against the client table on the database. This allows the underlying database to be replaced without making any change to the other tiers.

There are some who view a web application as a two-tier architecture. This can be a "smart" client that performs all the work and queries a "dumb" server, or a "dumb" client that relies on a "smart" server. The client would handle the presentation tier, the server would have the database (storage tier), and the business logic (application tier) would be on one of them or on both. While this increases the scalability of the applications and separates the display and the database, it still doesn't allow for true specialization of layers, so most applications will outgrow this model.

Security

Security breaches on these kinds of applications are a major concern because it can involve both enterprise information and private customer data. Protecting these assets is an important part of any web application and there 
are some key operational areas that must be included in the development process. This includes processes for authentication, authorization, asset handling, input, and logging and auditing. Building security into the applications from the beginning can be more effective and less disruptive in the long run.

Development
Writing web applications is simplified with the use of web application frameworks. These frameworks facilitate rapid application development by allowing a development team to focus on the parts of their application which are unique to their goals without having to resolve common development issues such as user management. Many of the frameworks in use are open-source software.

In addition, there is potential for the development of applications on Internet operating systems, although currently there are not many viable platforms that fit this model.

See also

 D3.js
Software as a service (SaaS)
Mobile development framework 
Web 2.0
Web engineering
Web GIS
Web services
Web sciences
Web widget

References

External links
HTML5 Draft recommendation,  changes to HTML and related APIs to ease authoring of web-based applications.

Web Applications Working Group at the World Wide Web Consortium (W3C)
PWAs on Web.dev by Google Developers.

Software architecture
 
Web development
User interface techniques